William Brouncker (c. 1620 – 1680) was an English politician who sat in the House of Commons in 1660.

Brouncker was the son of William Brouncker of Erlestoke, Wiltshire and his wife Anne Dauntsey, daughter of Sir John Dauntsey of Bishop's Lavington in the same county. He succeeded his father before 1650. He was J.P. for Wiltshire from 1652 to 1653.  In 1660, he was elected Member of Parliament for Westbury in the Convention Parliament. He was JP for Wiltshire again from March 1660 to about 1663 and commissioner for assessment from August 1660 until his death. By 1661 he was major in the foot militia.

Brouncker died at the age of about 60.

He married, by licence dated 24 September 1644, Katherine Moore, daughter of Thomas Moore of Hawkchurch, Devon, and had three sons and two daughters.

References

1620 births
1680 deaths
English MPs 1660